Dystasiopsis is a genus of longhorn beetles of the subfamily Lamiinae, containing the following species:

 Dystasiopsis malaccana Breuning, 1974
 Dystasiopsis spiniscapus Breuning & de Jong, 1941

References

Pteropliini